Surizai Bala is a village and Union Council in Peshawar District of Khyber Pakhtunkhwa. The Pashtuns of this village speak the Pashto language and practice Pashtunwali, a traditional code of conduct and honour.
Majer Mohalas are
Khan khel,
Hasham khel, 
Ibrahim khel.
Ataye khel,
Sher Khan khel 
Majeed khel
.....etc

References 

Populated places in Peshawar District